Kids BBQ Championship is an American cooking competition television series that aired on Food Network.

The first season of the series officially premiered on May 23, 2016; and it was presented by chef Eddie Jackson and model Camila Alves, who also served as judges. The season began with eight child chefs in the pilot episode and then ended with three finalists in the season finale, with the winner receiving $20,000. The second season of the series premiered on May 1, 2017, with Alves having been replaced by chef Damaris Phillips. The format of the series had also changed, as there were four different child chefs with a different winner in each episode; and said winner receiving $10,000.

In each episode, the two judges were joined by a rotating lineup of special guest chefs who would serve as the third judge.

Season 1

Episodes

Contestants

Season 2

Episodes

Notes

References

External links
 
 

2016 American television series debuts
2017 American television series endings
English-language television shows
Food Network original programming
Food reality television series
2010s American cooking television series
Television series about children
Television series about teenagers